The Kacheguda–Tirupati AC Double Decker Express was a Superfast Express connecting Hyderabad and Tirupati cities. It was one of the first AC Double Decker Express in the states of Telangana and Andhra Pradesh alongside Guntur–Kacheguda AC Double Decker Express. It had CZDAC coaches (AC chair-car) and VESDA (Very Early Smoke Detection with Alarm system), first of its kind, in a double-decker train.

References

Transport in Tirupati
Transport in Hyderabad, India
Double-decker trains of India
Rail transport in Andhra Pradesh
Rail transport in Telangana
Railway services introduced in 2014
Railway services discontinued in 2016
Defunct trains in India